Eric Roy Sandstrom (11 September 1931 – 19 May 2019) was a track and field sprinter, who represented Great Britain in the men's 100, 200 metres and 4 x 100metres relay at the 1956 Summer Olympics in Melbourne, Australia.

Sandstrom won the Gold medal in the 4x100 metres relay, two years later at, the 1958 European Championships in Stockholm, Sweden, alongside Peter Radford, David Segal and Adrian Breacker.

He was 1.74 m tall, weighed 65 kg, and was associated with Leichtathletik Club during his career. He died on 19 May 2019.

References

External links
 

1931 births
2019 deaths
Place of birth missing
English male sprinters
British male sprinters
Olympic male sprinters
Olympic athletes of Great Britain
Athletes (track and field) at the 1956 Summer Olympics
Commonwealth Games gold medallists for England
Commonwealth Games medallists in athletics
Athletes (track and field) at the 1958 British Empire and Commonwealth Games
European Athletics Championships medalists
Medallists at the 1958 British Empire and Commonwealth Games